Endreson is a surname. Notable people with the surname include:

Bjørn Endreson (1922–1998), Norwegian actor, stage producer, and theatre director
Håkon Endreson (1891–1970), Norwegian gymnast

See also
Endreson Cabin
Endresen

Norwegian-language surnames